Mohammad Emami-Kashani (born 3 October 1931) is a member of the Assembly of Experts of the Islamic Republic of Iran. He has been the Interim Friday Prayer Leader of Tehran. He is also the head of Shahid Motahari University, Tehran.

He has called al-Qaeda an "illegitimate child of America and Israel":

References and notes

External links

Enemies Don't See Iran's Realities, Fars News Agency,  2007-02-16

Iranian ayatollahs
Living people
1931 births
Members of the Assembly of Experts
Members of the Expediency Discernment Council
Combatant Clergy Association politicians
Members of the Guardian Council
Academic staff of Shahid Motahari University
Shia clerics from Isfahan